Songs from the Heart is a compilation album released by Australian recording artist Rick Price in 1996.
The album contains b-sides, album tracks and live versions of previously released singles.

Track listing
 "You're Never Alone"	
 "Nothing Can Stop Us Now"	
 "We're Got Each Other"	
 "Where Are You Now"	
 "If You Were My Baby"	
 "Wishin'"	
 "Heaven Knows" (Acoustic Version)	
 "Tenterfield Saddler"
 "Not A Day Goes By" (Acoustic Version)
 "Walk Away Renée" (Live)	
 "Fragile" (Live)	
 "What's Wrong With That Girl"  (Acoustic Version)	
 "Where Is the Love" (with Margaret Urlich) written by : Ralph MacDonald and William Salter (original Roberta Flack and Donny Hathaway)

References

Compilation albums by Australian artists
Rick Price albums
1996 greatest hits albums
Sony Music Australia compilation albums